Pekka Antero Suorsa (born 8 December 1967) is a Finnish former ski jumper. He competed in the large hill event at the 1988 Winter Olympics.

Career
He won a gold medal in the team large hill at the 1987 FIS Nordic World Ski Championships in Oberstdorf. Suorsa's earned two individual world cup career wins in 1985.

World Cup

Standings

Wins

References

External links

1967 births
Living people
People from Kajaani
Finnish male ski jumpers
FIS Nordic World Ski Championships medalists in ski jumping
Olympic ski jumpers of Finland
Ski jumpers at the 1988 Winter Olympics
Sportspeople from Kainuu
20th-century Finnish people